Alexander Sabino Argüelles (often spelled Arguelles; born 30 April 1964) is an American linguist notable for his work on Korean. He is highly committed to the learning of foreign languages, and was profiled in Michael Erard's Babel No More. He is one of the polyglots listed in Kenneth Hyltenstam's Advanced Proficiency and Exceptional Ability in Second Languages, and has been described by The New Yorker as "a legendary figure in the [polyglot] community".

He has taught in Korea, Lebanon, Singapore, and Dubai, and was a Group Director of Immersion Language Programs at Concordia Language Villages in Bemidji, Minnesota.

He is the son of the poet Ivan Argüelles and the nephew of the New Ageist José Argüelles.

Language learning
Highly driven, Argüelles devotes an average of nine hours a day to language learning, though stated that in his twenties he spent as much as sixteen hours daily learning. He advocates working on multiple languages daily for shorter periods (as little as 15 minutes), working on different areas in different languages, from reading novels, to writing grammatical exercises. He sets daily goals to language learning and has recorded his daily progress in logbooks going back over 20 years.

Argüelles is highly proficient in 10 languages: English, Spanish, French, German, Italian, Portuguese, Dutch, Catalan, Swedish and Korean, and is accomplished in many more, such as Latin, Greek and Sanskrit, which he had studied by the end of college. He has studied over 60 languages to various degrees of proficiency. He stated in 2019 that he had learning resources in his library for 142 languages.

Notable works

On Korean
Argüelles, Alexander, and Jong-Rok Kim (2000). A Historical, Literary and Cultural Approach to the Korean Language. Seoul: Hollym.
Argüelles, Alexander, and Jong-Rok Kim (2004). A Handbook of Korean Verbal Conjugation. Hyattsville, Maryland: Dunwoody Press.
Argüelles, Alexander (2007). Korean Newspaper Reader. Hyattsville, Maryland: Dunwoody Press.
Argüelles, Alexander (2010). North Korean Reader. Hyattsville, Maryland: Dunwoody Press.

Other works
Argüelles, Alexander (1994). Viking Dreams: Mythological and Religious Dream Symbolism in the Old Norse Sagas. Doctoral dissertation, University of Chicago.
Argüelles, Alexander (1999). 프랑스동사변화안내: La Conjugaison des Verbes. Seoul: 신아사.
Argüelles, Alexander (2006). English French Spanish German Dictionary. Beirut, Lebanon: Librairie du Liban.

Notes

References

External links

Interviews

August 2006
July 2008
July 2009
December 2010
January 2012
March 2012
April 2012
June 2012
February 2014
January 2017
September 2017

Other links

Alexander Argüelles's old website on the Wayback Machine

1964 births
21st-century lexicographers
American expatriates in Germany
American expatriates in Lebanon
American expatriates in Singapore
American expatriates in South Korea
American expatriates in the United Arab Emirates
American lexicographers
American orientalists
American philologists
Columbia University alumni
Koreanists
Linguists from the United States
Living people
People from Chicago
University of Chicago alumni